Urdaneta is one of the nine municipalities (municipios) that make up the Venezuelan state of Lara and, according to a 2007 population estimate by the National Institute of Statistics of Venezuela, the municipality has a population of 63,213.  The town of Siquisique is the municipal seat of the Urdaneta Municipality. The municipality is one of several in Venezuela named "Urdaneta Municipality" in honour of Venezuelan independence hero Rafael Urdaneta.

Demographics
The Urdaneta Municipality, according to a 2011 population census by the National Institute of Statistics of Venezuela, has a population of 61,381 (up from 56,063 in 2000). This amounts to 3.5% of the state's population.

Government
The mayor of the Urdaneta Municipality is Luis Gonzaga Ladino, elected on October 31, 2004, with 64% of the vote.  He replaced Willians Ereu shortly after the elections.  The municipality is divided into four parishes; Siquisique, Moroturo, San Miguel, and Xaguas.

References

External links
urdaneta-lara.gob.ve 

Municipalities of Lara (state)